List of Toei Subway stations lists stations on the Toei Subway, including station location (ward or city), opening date, design (underground, at-grade, or elevated), and daily ridership.

Summary
There are a total of 99 “unique” stations (i.e., counting stations served by multiple lines only once) on the Toei Subway network, or 106 total stations if each station on each line counts as one station. Almost all stations are located within the 23 special wards, with many located in areas not served by the complementary Tokyo Metro network.

The Tokyo Metropolitan Bureau of Transportation reports ridership for each station by line—stations served by multiple lines have multiple ridership figures, one for each line serving the station. Passengers making in-system transfers between lines are counted in the ridership of each line used, at the station where the transfer takes place. As a result, summing the total daily ridership of each of the lines will yield a total that is greater than the actual daily ridership of the system as a whole.

For stations directly shared with other railways—e.g., Shirokanedai and other Toei Mita Line stations shared with the Namboku Line, the daily ridership only considers people using Toei Subway trains (or through-servicing trains owned by other railways operating as Toei Subway trains). For “interface” stations designed to allow for through-servicing and transfers with other railways without exiting the station's paid area (e.g., Oshaige on the Asakusa Line), the station “entries” and “exits” also consider cross-company passengers riding on through-servicing trains (as part of trackage rights agreements) or transferring to or from other railways' trains without passing through faregates.

Opening dates are given in standard Japanese date format (YYYY.MM.DD).

Stations

References

See also
 List of Tokyo Metro stations

Toei Subway stations
Toei Subway stations
Toei Subway stations
Transport in Tokyo